The western soil-crevice skink (Proablepharus reginae) is a species of skink found in Australia.

References

Proablepharus
Reptiles described in 1960
Skinks of Australia
Endemic fauna of Australia
Taxa named by Ludwig Glauert